Tarud is a surname. Notable people with the surname include:

Adriana Tarud (born 1980), Colombian beauty queen
Rafael Tarud (1918–2009), Chilean politician